The 100th Pennsylvania House of Representatives District is located in Southeastern Pennsylvania and has been represented since 2007 by Bryan Cutler.

District profile
The 100th Pennsylvania House of Representatives District is located in Lancaster County. It includes Wheatland. It is made up of the following areas:

 Bart Township
 Colerain Township
 Drumore Township
 East Drumore Township
 Eden Township
 Fulton Township
 Lancaster Township (PART, District 09)
 Leacock Township
 Little Britain Township
 Martic Township
  Millersville (including Millersville University of Pennsylvania)
 Paradise Township
 Pequea Township
 Providence Township
 Quarryville

Representatives

Recent election results

References

External links
District map from the United States Census Bureau
Pennsylvania House Legislative District Maps from the Pennsylvania Redistricting Commission.  
Population Data for District 100 from the Pennsylvania Redistricting Commission.

Government of Lancaster County, Pennsylvania
100